Commiphora gileadensis, the Arabian balsam tree, is a shrub species in the genus Commiphora growing in Saudi Arabia, Yemen, southern Oman, Sudan and in southeast Egypt where it may have been introduced. Other common names for the plant include balm of Gilead and Mecca myrrh, but this is due to historical confusion between several plants and the historically important expensive perfumes and drugs obtained from them.

True balm of Gilead was very rare, and appears to have been produced from the unrelated tree Pistacia lentiscus. The Commiphora gileadensis species also used to include Commiphora foliacea, however it was identified and described as a separate species

Use

Historical
The plant was renowned for the expensive perfume that was thought to be produced from it, as well as for exceptional medicinal properties that were attributed to its sap, wood, bark, and seeds. Commiphora gileadensis is instantly recognisable by the pleasant smell given out when a twig is broken or a leaf crushed.

Modern
The bark of the balsam tree is cut to cause the sap to flow out. This soon hardens, and has a sweet smell that quickly evaporates. The hardened resinous gum is chewed, is said to taste either like a lemon or like pine resin, and it is also burned as incense.

Description
Depending on where Commiphora gileadensis is growing, it can vary in size, ranging from a small-leaved shrub to a large-leaved tree usually up to 4m tall.  It is rarely spiny, bark peeling or flaking when cut and exuding a pleasant smelling resin. Its leaves alternate on short condensed side shoots, pinnate with 3-5 leaflets.  The leaflets are oblong, 5-40mm long x 3-35mm across with acute tips and are thinly hairy.  The flowers are red, sub-sessile and the plant has 1-5 of them on short condensed side shoots amongst the leaves. The fruits are dull red and marked with four longitudinal white stripes, one-seeded and splitting into 2-4 valves.

References

gileadensis